Heinrich Strasser (born 26 October 1948) is an Austrian football defender who played for Austria in the 1978 FIFA World Cup. He also played for FC Admira Wacker Mödling and First Vienna FC.

Achievements
 1 × Austrian Cup
 Participation at the 1978 FIFA World Cup: 7 place
 26 International Caps for the Austria national football team

References

External links
FIFA profile

1948 births
Austrian footballers
Austria international footballers
Association football defenders
FC Admira Wacker Mödling players
First Vienna FC players
1. Simmeringer SC players
1978 FIFA World Cup players
Living people
Footballers from Vienna
Austrian football managers
FC Admira Wacker Mödling managers